William Saxey D.D. (d. 1 April 1577) was a Canon of Windsor from 1566 to 1577.

Career
He was educated at Oxford University and graduated B.C.L. 1526 and B.Can.L. 1530.

He was appointed:
Vicar of St Bride's, Fleet Street 1530 - 1543
Prebendary of Willesden in St Paul's 1533 - 1566
Canon of Southwell Minster 1542
Rector of St Nicolas' Church, Guildford 1546
Rector of Swanscome, Kent 1546
Rector of Lawshall, Suffolk 1547
Treasurer of St Paul's Cathedral 1559

He was appointed to the fourth stall in St George's Chapel, Windsor Castle in 1566, and held the stall until 1577.

Notes 

Year of birth missing
1577 deaths
Canons of Windsor